Baghakol is a village located in Haspura Tehsil of Aurangabad district of Bihar, India.

References 

Villages in Aurangabad district, Bihar